Kinfolks Ridge is an unincorporated community in Pemiscot County, in the U.S. state of Missouri.

Kinfolks Ridge was so named for the fact a large share of the early settlers in this community were related.

References

Unincorporated communities in Pemiscot County, Missouri
Unincorporated communities in Missouri